Lukač may refer to:

Places
Lukač, Croatia, a Croatian village

People 
Milan Lukač (born 1985), Serbian footballer
Nermina Lukac (born 1990), Swedish actress
Patrik Lukáč (born 1994), Slovak footballer
Rudolf Lukáč (born 1969), Slovak weightlifter
Vincent Lukáč (born 1954), Slovak ice hockey player and coach

See also
Lukács (surname)